Chiang Klang is a district (amphoe) in the northern part of Nan province, northern Thailand.

Geography

Neighbouring districts are, from the north clockwise, Thung Chang, Pua, Tha Wang Pha and Song Khwae.

The eastern part of the district is in the Luang Prabang Range mountain area of the Thai highlands.

History
The minor district (king amphoe) was created on 20 June 1968, when the four tambons, Puea, Chiang Klang, Chiang Khan, and Na Rai Luang, were split off from Thung Chang district. It was upgraded to a full district on 16 November 1971.

Administration
The district is divided into six sub-districts (tambons), which are further subdivided into 59 villages (mubans). There are two townships (thesaban tambon) in Chiang Klang District. The first one is Chiang Klang, which covers parts of tambon Chiang Klang, Puea, and Phaya Kaeo. Another is Phra Phutthabat Chiang Khan, which covers tambons Phra Phutthabat and Chiang Khan. There are a further four tambon administrative organizations (TAO).

The missing numbers are the tambon which now form Song Khwae District.

Gallery

References

External links
amphoe.com

Chiang Klang